Voris is a Dutch surname, derived from Voorhees (surname). Notable people with the surname include:

Dick Voris, American football player and coach
Jeff Voris, American football coach
Michael Voris (born 1961), American Roman Catholic activist and apologist
Roy Marlin Voris (1919–2005), American aviator and World War II flying ace
Zoe Voris (born 1998), American wheelchair basketball player

See also
 Voris Marker (1908–1973), American fashion designer and sculptor.
 Voorhees (disambiguation)

References